Irina Nikolayevna Kalentieva (born 10 November 1977 in Batyrevsky District, Chuvashia) is a retired professional cross-country mountain bike racer from Russia. She won the UCI Mountain Bike & Trials World Championships in 2007 and 2009.

She also won a bronze medal at the 2008 Summer Olympics in Beijing and finished fourth at the 2012 Summer Olympics in London and 13th at the 2004 Summer Olympics.

References

1977 births
Living people
Chuvash people
People from Batyrevsky District
Cyclo-cross cyclists
Cross-country mountain bikers
Russian female cyclists
Cyclists at the 2004 Summer Olympics
Cyclists at the 2008 Summer Olympics
Cyclists at the 2012 Summer Olympics
Cyclists at the 2016 Summer Olympics
Olympic cyclists of Russia
Olympic bronze medalists for Russia
Olympic medalists in cycling
Medalists at the 2008 Summer Olympics
UCI Mountain Bike World Champions (women)
Sportspeople from Chuvashia